Clayton, Dubilier & Rice (CD&R) is an American private equity company. It is one of the oldest private equity investment firms in the world.  Founded in 1978, CD&R has managed the investment of more than $30 billion in approximately 90 businesses, representing a broad range of industries with an aggregate transaction value in excess of $140 billion. Approximately half of CD&R's investments have involved corporate divestitures.

CD&R had ownership stakes in, among others, B&M Retail, Envision Healthcare, The Hertz Corporation, Hussman International, Rexel (a distributor of electrical parts and equipment) and US Foods (a broadline foodservice distributor), Sally Beauty, Diversey, Inc., VWR International, Brake Bros, Kinko's (now FedEx Office, previously FedEx Kinko's), Uniroyal Goodrich Tire Company and Lexmark.

History

Clayton & Dubilier was founded as a turnaround management shop by Martin H. Dubilier, Eugene Clayton and Bill Welsh in 1976. Joseph L. Rice III, a deal professional, putting the firm into investment business, joined in 1978, and the firm became known as Clayton, Dubilier & Rice in 1992. Clayton and Welsh retired from the firm in 1985 and Dubilier died in 1991.

The firm executed a leveraged buyout in 1987 of Borg-Warner's Industrial Products Division, spinning the division off into a standalone company, BW/IP International. Between 1987 and 1992 the firm added nine new partners, five of which had previous experience as CEOs.

In 1988, the firm acquired Uniroyal Goodrich Tire Company and a 50% stake of B.F. Goodrich for $225 million; the Tire Company was sold to Michelin for $1.5 billion in 1989.

In 1990, CD&R formed Lexmark from IBM's printer and keyboard manufacturing business. The deal was named one of the 30 Most Influential Private Equity Deals by Private Equity International in 2004.

In 1998, Don Gogel was appointed CEO. Also in 1998, CD&R established an office in London.

In 2001, Jack Welch, former CEO of General Electric, joined CD&R as a senior advisor.

In 2005, CD&R teamed with Merrill Lynch, The Carlyle Group and Barclays to acquire The Hertz Corporation from Ford Motor Company for $15 billion.

In 2011, CD&R and Ingersoll-Rand announced a partnership relating to Ingersoll's Hussmann division in which CD&R would acquire a 60 percent interest.

In 2012, Joe Rice stepped down as chairman, succeeded by Don Gogel.

In March 2013, CD&R partnered with the family owners of B&M retail, acquiring a 60 percent stake. In October 2013, the firm acquired a 60% stake in John Deere Landscapes (now SiteOne Landscape Supply) in partnership with Deere & Co., which retained a 40 percent stake.

In 2015, CD&R sold Hussmann to Panasonic for $1.5 billion.

Clayton Dubilier & Rice Fund X LP completed fundraising in 2017 with $10 billion of investor commitments.

CD&R acquired a 60% stake of Capco from FIS for $477 million in May 2017. In August 2017, the firm acquired the Waterworks division of HD Supply for 2.5 billion, and changed its name to Core & Main.

In January 2018, Clayton, Dubilier & Rice acquired Ply Gem Holdings, Inc. and Atrium Windows & Doors. In October 2018, the firm acquired a stake in SmileDirectClub after investing $380 million.

In 2018 CD&R acquired a 60% stake from the family owners of greeting card maker American Greetings, establishing a partnership.

In January 2019, Clayton, Dubilier & Rice invested alongside the founder of WSH Investments Ltd., Alistair Storey, to take a major stake in the business.

In July 2019, Clayton, Dubilier & Rice were included on Inc.'''s 50 Best Private Equity Firms for Entrepreneurs list.

In September 2019, CD&R acquired a stake in Socotec in a deal valuing Socotec at $1.98 billion.

In August 2020, CD&R bought Epicor from KKR for $4.7 billion.

In January 2021, CD&R purchased Wolseley UK, the largest supplier of plumbing and building materials in the UK, from Ferguson plc for £308m.

In October 2021, CD&R purchased Morrisons, a British supermarket chain, which subsequently had financial difficulties.

In April 2022 CD&R acquired a 60% interest in Humana, Inc's hospice and personal care divisions (Kindred at Home) for US$2.8 billion.

In July 2022, CD&R purchased the remaining common stock of Cornerstone Building Brands, completing its acquisition.

In February 2023, CD&R agreed to buyout Focus Financial Partners in an all-cash deal for a total enterprise value of over $7billion.

References

External links

 Clayton, Dubilier, and Rice website
 Interview with Don Gogel (35 m.), Charlie Rose'', May 24, 2012. Regarding role of private equity in US economy and specifically President Obama's attacks on Republican challenger Mitt Romney's record at Bain Capital in the 2012 campaign.

Private equity firms of the United States
American companies established in 1978
Financial services companies established in 1978
1978 establishments in New York City
Financial services companies based in New York City